Lyle Areanne Lopez (born June 1, 1985 in Quezon City) is a Filipino actor, singer and preacher.
Formerly known as L.A. Lopez''', he was "discovered" by the comedy king Dolphy Quizon in a talent search titled That's My Boy. He began his career as a child actor on the children's show Eh Kasi Bata''. Garnered several Awit Awards as a child singer.

He made a comeback in 2002 with the song "Yakap" which made it to the top Billboard charts and Radio countdowns in the Philippines.
Lyle is a born-again Christian, and currently the head pastor and worship leader in Abundant Harvest Fellowship Philippines, A missionary church from Crescent City Florida, planted at the heart of Quezon City Philippines.

He also established Jzone Pinoy, the Tagalog wing of the Christ Commission Fellowship's Youth Ministry J-Zone (now Elevate).  He studied Musical Theatre in Florida School of the Arts, U.S.A under the Presidential scholarship granted to him. Recently, he composed and released a song entitled "I See You" which became the theme for ABS-CBN's My Binondo Girl Love Team Jade and Andy.

Despite various allegations, Lyle Lopez aka L.A. Lopez has been called an icon during his child star days and remains as an impassioned artist who wishes to : "Make a difference through his craft by the grace of God."

Discography
 Ang Batang Mabait (1993, Alpha Music)
 Shine (1997, Alpha Music)
 Yakap (2002, Star Records) received his gold record award.
 Love Never Fails (2016, Windsound)
 Ikaw Pa Rin (2018, Star Music)

References
Lyle Lopez official website – https://web.archive.org/web/20100127213540/http://lylelopez.net/
Lyle Lopez Embraces Pastorhood – http://www.philstar.com/Article.aspx?articleId=645104&publicationSubCategoryId=51

Specific

External links
 
 Lyle Lopez official website

1985 births
Living people
People from Quezon City
Male actors from Metro Manila
20th-century Filipino male actors
Star Magic
Filipino male child actors
21st-century Filipino male singers
Filipino Presbyterians
Filipino evangelicals
Filipino Pentecostals